Immingham Augustinian Friary was a friary in Lincolnshire, England.

Monasteries in Lincolnshire